Wen Tianxiang (June 6, 1236 – January 9, 1283), noble title Duke of Xin, was a Chinese poet and politician in the last years of the Southern Song dynasty. For his resistance to Kublai Khan's invasion of the Southern Song dynasty, and for his refusal to yield to the Yuan dynasty despite being captured and tortured, he is a popular symbol of patriotism, righteousness, and resistance against tyranny in China. He is known as one of the 'Three Loyal Princes of the Song', alongside Lu Xiufu and Zhang Shijie. Wen Tianxiang is depicted in the Wu Shuang Pu (無雙譜, Table of Peerless Heroes) by Jin Guliang.

His continuing symbolic importance was evident in an event that took place in Wen Tianxiang's historical shrine in Haifeng (Haifeng County) in 1908, where Chen Jiongming persuaded over thirty young men from the village to swear secret support for a national revolution.

Biography
Wen was born on 6 June 1236 in Luling (Ji'an), Jiangxi Province during the Song dynasty. At the age of 18, he excelled in his local examinations, and two years later participated in examinations in the capital, during which he was personally awarded first rank (Zhuangyuan) by Emperor Lizong. He would subsequently take up several posts in the government of the Southern Song, including being Attendant of the Justice Ministry and Prefect of Ganzhou. Wen Tianxiang was in conflict with the corrupted magistrated Jia Sidao and the pro-peace faction as he support the war effort against the invading Mongols. Wen once requested the execution of a eunuch who proposed fleeing from the capital Lin'an. As a result Wen was demoted and forced into premature retirement at the age of 37.

Later when the war situation further deteriotated, Wen was recalled an appointed as the Prefect of Ganzhou. He immediately recruited some troops from the local population and was later assigned to defend the region of Pingjiang (now in Suzhou, Jiangsu). In 1275, Yuan Mongols troops under Bayan attacked the Jiangsu and Jiejiang regions. Yuan forces quickly bypassed Pingjiang and marched directly to the region now known as Yuhang District. Wen Tianxiang hurriedly rushed to Yuhang but he was too late, his former base in Pingjiang was also quickly overwhelmed by the Mongols. Wen and his troops then retreated back to Lin'an. Together with Zhang Shijie, Wen Tianxiang proposed a plan to keep fighting, but it was rejected by Chancellor of the Right Chen Yizhong. At that time many Song court officials (including Chancellor of the Left Liu Mengyang) already ran away fearing the approaching Yuan troops, other was mostly pro-peace faction. Pro-war figures like Zhang Shijie also left to continued the fight on their own. The Song Empress Dowager finally decided to surrender, and Wen was appointed as the new Chancellor of the Right to lead the Song delegation (1276).

Wen Tianxiang didn't pledge for a surrender as tasked. When meeting Bayan, Wen inquired Bayan about the Mongol's intention and demanded the retreat of the Yuan forces:

Seeing that Wen Tianxiang was determined to not surrender, Bayan arrested Wen in the Mongol headquarters. An enraged but helpless Wen Tianxiang could only witness the Empress Dowager and other Song court magistrate finalized their surrender. Nonetheless, Wen managed to escape from the Yuan Mongol camp, and head to Yang province. The Yang prefect wrongly suspected Wen as a spy from the Yuan, therefore Wen further travelled south and finally met Zhang Shije and Chen Yizhong in Fuzhou, this time with a newly crowned Emperor Duanzong. After a brief discussion, Wen travelled to Nanjian pronvince (now located as Nanping, Fujian province) to recruit troops, then marched to Jiangxi. Wen managed to gain several victories, but he was soon overwhelmed by the Yuan forces led by Zhang Hongfan and was arrested (1278).

Wen was treated well by Zhang Hongfan and was promised a prestigious Yuan post in exchange for his surrender, but Wen refused. Later, Song resistance forces was completely destroyed at the Battle of Yamen (1279), Zhang again provide the same offer, reasoning that Wen was no longer bound by the already perished as Song Dynasty. Wen again categorically refused, saying that "I was a court officer of the Song but failed to save the country. I am deserved to be a criminal, why should I cling to my life now ?" Zhang had no choice but escort Wen to Dadu. He was imprisoned in a military prison. During this time he wrote the poems "Song of Righteousness", and "Crossing the Lingding Sea", the latter of which included these lines of defiance in the face of Mongol rule:

The Yuan court, still clinged to the hope of persuade Wen Tianxiang, sent the former Song Chancellor Liu Mengyan (the one who ran away when the Mongol approached Lin'an) to see Wen in prison. An enraged Wen Tianxiang immediately gave Liu a violent scolding. The Yuan continued to send former Emperor Gong of Song to persuade Wen, but he simply answered: "Your Highness please come back to the palace !" Later his brother Wen Pi was also sent to the prison with the same task, and Wen Tianxang said: "We have the same parents but do not serve the under the same sky !" During the imprisonment, Wen Tianxiang also received letters from his daughter, informed him that his whole family was held captive in the Yuan royal palace. Wen then replied: "I have received the letter, my soul hurts so much. Everybody have relatives and family, but in this circumstance I can only choose death, there is no alternative."

In 1283, Wen Tianxiang was summoned to appear before Kublai Khan. He briefly bowed his head to greet the Yuan Emperor, but refused to prostrate as a subordinate of the Yuan. Kublai Khan expressed respect to Wen and again provide the same offer of a prestigious position. Wen repeated his refusal, saying: "I am Song's chancellor, I cannot serve other dynasty ! I can only accept death, if not, I cannot face the matyrs at the Underworld. [...] I only desire death, I have nothing to say." At that time an uprising arosed and the rebels claimed to attack Dadu "to rescue Chancellor Wen". Kublai Khan had no choice but to execute Wen Tianxiang.

It is said that after Wen's death, people discover his death poem written as:

Ancestry and descendants 
Wen Tianxiang adopted the three sons of his younger brother when his two sons died young.

There are now at least six branches of the Wen family in the provinces of Jiangxi, Hunan, Hainan, Guangdong, Fujian, and in Hong Kong and overseas locations. Local dialect pronunciations would be Man (Cantonese), Vun (Hakka), Boon (Hokkien) and Bhung (Teochew). The Man clan are considered one of the original founding families in the history of Hong Kong.

The well-known Ming dynasty painter and calligrapher Wen Zhengming also belonged to the Wen family. The mother of Mao Zedong, Wen Qimei, was a descendant as well.

One of the oldest continuous branches of the Wen family established itself in the Hengyang/Hengshan area of present-day Hunan shortly after 1000. A branch of this Wen family settled in the United States in the mid-1940s and is related through marriage to the prominent Sun family of Shouxian, Anhui (Sun Jianai; Fou Foong Flour Company 福豐麵粉廠) and the Li family of Hefei, Anhui (Li Hongzhang).

Monuments

Jiangxi
Wen Tianxiang's hometown in Ji'an, Jiangxi honors the famous national hero with a mausoleum. Exhibitions of paintings, calligraphy, and even army uniforms supposedly left by Wen are displayed in the Wen Family Ancestral Temple in Futian. The Wen Tianxiang Mausoleum is located in Wohushan.

Beijing
The Memorial to Prime Minister Wen Tianxiang was built in 1376 during the reign of the Hongwu Emperor of the Ming dynasty. The location of Wen's execution is thought to be near the entrance to Fuxue Alley in the East City District of Beijing and a memorial has been established on the northern side of the entrance to South Fuxue Alley near Beixinqiao.

"The Song Dynasty's Top Ranking Scholar and Prime Minister, the West River's Filial Son and Loyal Subject," is carved into the columns of the memorial's main hall.

Guangdong

The "Golden Marshal's Cemetery" commemorating the heroes of the anti-Yuan nationality at the end of the Song dynasty was established in the Gurao Township, Chaoyang District, Shantou City, Guangdong Province. There are many legends about Wen Tianxiang in the area of Gurao Town, Chaoyang District. According to legend, in the last years of the Southern Song dynasty, Wen Tianxiang raised an army in Chaoyang to resist the invading Yuan forces and was captured in Haifeng County during the campaign. Due to the great disparity in strength between the two sides, most of the Song soldiers were killed. Based on investigation, there are nine Song tombs in Gu Rao and neighboring towns. In later years, festive activities were held to commemorate Marshal General Wen Tianxiang and his descendant, These develop into what is known as the Gurao Festival. During this festival, the villages are covered with red and green, and the villagers walk through the streets to perform folk art tours. Overseas travellers have also returned to their hometowns.

Taiwan
In the late 1950s and 1960s, a place called , within the present Taroko National Park, was renamed "Tianxiang" in memory of Wen Tianxiang during the construction of the Central Cross-Island Highway. Tianxiang is now a famous resort in the east of Taiwan.

In addition, three streets also take their name from Wen (i.e. the "Tianxiang Road"). One is in Zhongshan District, Taipei nearby the Minquan W. Road MRT Station, another is in Sanmin District, Kaohsiung and the other is in Xiulin, Hualien County.

Hong Kong
The San Tin area in the New Territories of Hong Kong is home to many villagers surnamed "Man", the Cantonese pronunciation of "Wen". The "Man" villagers trace their ancestry to Wen Tianxiang via Man Tin-Sui, also a famous Song dynasty general and the cousin of Wen Tianxiang.

A Man Tin Cheung Memorial Park and "Man" ancestral hall and residence (Tai Fu Tai Mansion) in San Tin are historical attractions in Hong Kong.

See also
History of the Song dynasty
List of Chinese people
Grand chancellor (China)
Yue Fei
Lu Xiufu
Zhang Shijie
Wang Anshi
Sima Guang
Fan Zhongyan

References

Further reading 
Writing Poetry as Diary: Wen Tianxiang's Poem Series Yuan-fang Tung, The Chinese University of Hong Kong
"Writ in Blood": Wen Tianxiang's Lyric Songs Yang Ye, University of California, Riverside
Intellectual and Aesthetic Contexts for Wen Tianxiang's Poetry Michael A. Fuller, University of California, Irvine

External links
 Man Tin Cheung Park in Hong Kong

1236 births
1283 deaths
13th-century Chinese poets
Executed Song dynasty people
Song dynasty chancellors
Song dynasty poets
Song dynasty politicians from Jiangxi
People executed by the Yuan dynasty by decapitation
Poets from Jiangxi
Politicians from Ji'an
Yuan dynasty poets
Heads of government who were later imprisoned
Legendary Chinese people